{{Infobox college ice hockey team
|current               = 2022–23 UConn Huskies men's ice hockey season
|team_name             = UConn Huskies
|team_link             = 
|image                 = Connecticut Huskies wordmark.svg
|image_size            = 250
|university            = University of Connecticut
|sex                   = men's
|conference            = Hockey East
|conference_short      = Hockey East
|location              = Hartford, Connecticut
|coach                 = Mike Cavanaugh<ref>

The UConn Huskies men's ice hockey team is a National Collegiate Athletic Association (NCAA) Division I college ice hockey program that represents the University of Connecticut. The Huskies are a member of Hockey East. The Huskies currently play at XL Center in Hartford, Connecticut; the team will move to the new on-campus UConn Hockey Arena starting with the 2023–24 season.

History

The Huskies men's ice hockey program began in 1960 under head coach John Chapman. UConn began NCAA competition at the NCAA Division III level in the ECAC East.

Prior to 1998, the Huskies played all home games outdoors at a partially enclosed rink on-campus near Memorial Stadium. The UConn Hockey Rink had a roof but was open on the sides.  However, in preparation for the upgrade to Division I, the University built the Mark Edward Freitas Ice Forum. Construction began in 1996, and the first indoor home game for UConn was on November 7, 1998.

The move to NCAA Division I status allowed the team to join other Husky athletic programs. In 1998 they joined the Metro Atlantic Athletic Conference, after previously playing for 38 years in the Division III ECAC East. At the time, head coach Bruce Marshall was in his tenth season at the position. In its 2nd season in the 2000 MAAC Men's Ice Hockey Tournament, Uconn beat Iona 6-1 to win its 1st league championship. However, due to a 2-year probationary period placed on the MAAC for an automatic bid to the NCAA Ice Hockey championship by the league champion, UConn was unable to participate in the NCAA tournament that year. It has been the only championship Uconn would earn since moving to Division I (as of May, 2016). But when the athletic department was forced to remove all athletic scholarships from the sport in order to comply with Title IX, and the Huskies consistently finished in the bottom few spots of the national computer rankings before the most recent season. In 2003, the MAAC formed a new league called Atlantic Hockey.

In June 2010, the University announced that the team would face Sacred Heart at Rentschler Field in East Hartford on February 13, 2011, as part of a doubleheader also featuring a game between the women's team and the Providence Friars. The Huskies won this game 3-1, in front of 1,711 fans. The Huskies also played their first ever game at the XL Center in downtown Hartford that year, though this was not originally scheduled. Due to heavy snow accumulation on the Freitas roof, the team's February 5 game against Army was moved to the off-camps arena, also home to the Connecticut Whale of the American Hockey League. In spite of free admission, only 891 fans turned up on short notice to watch the Huskies lose 5-3. As a whole, the 2010-11 season was also a major improvement for the Huskies, who advance to the Atlantic Hockey Tournament semifinals at Blue Cross Arena before being eliminated. They finished with a final record of 16-18-4. One of the major factors in the turnaround was the young recruits the Huskies had signed. Freshman Cole Schneider led the team with 32 points, while sophomore Sean Ambrosie finished second with 29.  Meanwhile, sophomore Garrett Bartus set a school record with 1,085 saves. The 2011-12 AHA preseason rankings reflected the newly gained reputation, with the Huskies ranked fifth out of twelve teams. The Huskies posted a winning record once again in the 2012-13 season.

On June 21, 2012, UConn announced the program would join Hockey East as the conference's 12th member beginning in the 2014-15 season.  Prior to the move into Hockey East, on January 7, 2013, head coach Bruce Marshall resigned after 25 years   and was replaced in interim by Asst. Dave Berard.  The season ended with a record of 17-13-4.  The team finished 4th in the AHA, drawing a crowd of 1438 for their final home game of the season against Sacred Heart. As part of the move from Atlantic Hockey to Hockey East, the university added 18 scholarships for the men's ice hockey team and additional scholarships to existing women's sports programs to meet Title IX gender equity requirements. The university is also investigating options to significantly renovate the Freitas Ice Forum, which has a seating capacity around 2,000 fans, and mostly consists of metal bleachers; or build a new, larger ice arena on-campus. As a new member of Hockey East the team will play home games at the 15,635-seat former NHL arena, the  XL Center in downtown Hartford, with other select (home) games at the Webster Bank Arena in Bridgeport, CT. A study by the university projected a cost around $20,000 a game to play at the XL Center.

New Head Coach Mike Cavanaugh, who spent 18 seasons as an assistant at Boston College, was hired to guide Uconn into their new era of scholarship hockey in the Hockey East. He coached Uconn's final season (2013–14) in Atlantic Hockey to a record of 18-14-4, with wins over future Hockey East opponents Providence and Umass, while playing to a 2-2 draw with eventual 2014 NCAA Champ Union . Uconn made a successful transition to Hockey East in 2014-15 as they finished in the top 10 nationally in home attendance (5,396) while also leading their new conference . They were also competitive on the ice as their transition year resulted in 4 wins over top 20 teams while gaining ties with national championship game finalists Providence and Boston University. Starting in the 2015-16 season all home games were played at the XL Center, which drew a much better attendance per game (5,879) than those at the Webster Bank Arena (2,900) in which Uconn appeared during the 2014-15 season.

Groundbreaking took place on May 22, 2021 to start construction for UConn's new $48 million ice hockey rink at the Storrs campus, for an opening in fall 2022. The 2,600-seat arena (plus standing room), expected to open in 2023, will be located adjacent to the current Freitas Ice Arena in the Athletics District on Jim Calhoun Way. The team facilities will also include team lounges; dry locker area and locker rooms with video displays; training space with a hydrotherapy area; strength and conditioning room; and other areas such as coaches' offices. The new 97,300-square-foot facility will  meet all NCAA Division I ice hockey requirements and all Hockey East regulations, which the Freitas Ice Forum does not.

Season-by-season results

Source:

Coaching staff

The Huskies are coached by Mike Cavanaugh, the fourth head coach in program history.

All-time coaching records
As of completion of 2021-22 season

† David Berard served as an interim head coach after Bruce Marshall took a medical leave of absence.

Awards and honors

NCAA

All-Americans
AHCA Second Team All-Americans

2020–21: Jonny Evans, F
2021–22: Ryan Tverberg, F

ECAC East

All-Conference Teams
First Team All-ECAC East

1991–92: Chris Potter, D; Bryan Krygier, F
1992–93: Chris Potter, D
1994–95: Bryan Quinn, F
1995–96: Ryan Equale, F

Second Team All-ECAC East

1987–88: Todd Krygier, F
1989–90: Bryan Krygier, F
1990–91: Bryan Krygier, F
1991–92: Mike Krygier, F
1993–94: D. J. LeBlanc, F
1997–98: Eric Linkowski, D

MAAC

Individual awards

MAAC Defensive Rookie of the Year
Eric Nelson, D: 2002

MAAC Tournament Most Valuable Player
Marc Senerchia, G: 2000

All-Conference Teams
First Team All-MAAC

1998–99: Geoff Angell, F
2001–02: Mike Boylan, D

Second Team All-MAAC

1998–99: Rob Martin, D
2000–01: Michael Goldkind, F

MAAC All-Rookie Team

1998–99: Jon Chain, G; Mike Boylan, D
2000–01: Eric Nelson, D
2001–02: Adam Rhein, D

Atlantic Hockey

Individual awards

Atlantic Hockey Player of the Year
Tim Olsen, F: 2004

Atlantic Hockey Best Defensive Forward
Trevor Stewart, C: 2007

Atlantic Hockey Regular Season Goaltending Award
Matt Grogan: 2013

Atlantic Hockey Regular Season Scoring Trophy
Tim Olsen, F: 2004

All-Conference Teams
First Team All-Atlantic Hockey

2003–04: Eric Nelson, D; Tim Olsen, F
2004–05: Tim Olsen, F
2011–12: Cole Schneider, F

Second Team All-Atlantic Hockey

2006–07: Matt Scherer, F
2007–08: Beau Erickson, G
2008–09: Sean Erickson, D
2011–12: Alex Gerke, D

Third Team All-Atlantic Hockey

2006–07: Sean Erickson, D
2012–13: Matt Grogan, G
2013–14: Brant Harris, F

Atlantic Hockey All-Rookie Team

2003–04: Scott Tomes, G; Matt Scherer, F
2004–05: Brad Smith, G
2005–06: Sean Erickson, D
2009–10: Alex Greke, D
2010–11: Cole Schneider, F

Hockey East

Individual awards

Best Defensive Forward
 Jáchym Kondelík: 2022

All-Conference Teams
First Team

2021–22: Ryan Tverberg, F

Second Team

2015–16: Maxim Letunov, F
2017–18: Maxim Letunov, F
2021–22: Jáchym Kondelík, F

Third Team

2016–17: Tage Thompson, F
2018–19: Karl El-Mir, F

Rookie Team

2015–16: Maxim Letunov, F

Statistical leaders
Source:

Career points leaders

Career goaltending leaders

GP = Games played; Min = Minutes played; GA = Goals against; SO = Shutouts; SV% = Save percentage; GAA = Goals against average

Minimum 50 Games

Statistics current through the start of the 2021-22 season.

Current roster 
As of September 12, 2022.

Huskies in the NHL
As of July 1, 2022.

Source:

References

External links

 
Ice hockey teams in Connecticut
1960 establishments in Connecticut
Ice hockey clubs established in 1960